Silvano Villa (born August 13, 1951 in Villasanta) is a retired Italian professional football player.

Career
Villa began playing football with Milan but did not initially feature for the first team. After a loan spell with lower-level side Alessandria, he returned to Milan where he would make his Serie A debut against Foggia on 4 October 1970. He played 5 seasons (89 games, 18 goals) in the Serie A for A.C. Milan, U.C. Sampdoria and U.S. Foggia.

He scored 5 goals for A.C. Milan in the 1971–72 UEFA Cup.

References

1951 births
Living people
Italian footballers
Italy under-21 international footballers
Serie A players
Serie B players
A.C. Milan players
U.S. Alessandria Calcio 1912 players
U.C. Sampdoria players
Calcio Foggia 1920 players
S.S. Arezzo players
Ascoli Calcio 1898 F.C. players
Cagliari Calcio players
U.S. Pistoiese 1921 players
S.S.D. Lucchese 1905 players
A.S.D. HSL Derthona players
Association football forwards